Roman Knoll (27 October 1888, in Kiev – 6 March 1946, in Katowice) was a Polish politician, diplomat, and Freemason.

References

1888 births
1946 deaths
Politicians from Kyiv
Polish politicians
Polish diplomats
Polish Freemasons